A  is a kami or god who inhabits a human being or his house to bring misery and poverty. Several Japanese folklores, essays, and rakugos refer to it. Concerning binbōgami's preference of baked miso, in Senba, Osaka, (:ja:船場 (大阪市)) the following story is told:

There used to be an event till about 1877 to send binbōgami away: At the end of each month, merchants in Senba made baked and plate-shaped miso, then a bantō (番頭, head clerk), with the plate-shaped miso in his hands, walked around till the air was filled with its appetizing smell. After a while, he bent the plate-shaped miso closed. The miso's smell makes binbōgamis come out of the houses they inhabit and traps them in it. The bantō dumps the miso into a river and washes the smell away before returning. According to poet Mitsuyuki Nakamura, binbōgami has an uchiwa to draw in and enjoy miso's smell.

Description
Generally, a binbōgami appears as a skinny, dirty old man, who wields both an uchiwa and a kendama in his hands and wears one broken geta on his foot.

Toen Shōsetsu (兎園小説), the mystery stories written by Kyokutei Bakin and others includes a story of kyūki (窮鬼):

In 1821, there was a bushi house with ever-present misery. One day, the man who served the house went to Sōka and came across a bonze. The man asked him where he came from. The bonze replied he came from the man's house. The man said that he had never seen the bonze before. "I'm binbōgami," the bonze answered, "and that's why so many people in the house caught an illness. That house has enough misery, so I shall go to another house. Your master will have better luck hereafter" and the bonze disappeared. Just as the bonze said, people in the house experienced better luck gradually.

Being a kami, a binbōgami cannot be killed. A story in Niigata Prefecture describes how:

If you light an irori on an ōmisoka, irori's heat kicks binbōgami out and invites fukunokami (福の神, the kami of good luck) who likes the warmth of irori. There are many other superstitions which connect binbōgami with irori, including that of Tsushima, Ehime Prefecture: If an irori is lit too repeatedly, binbōgami appears.

Tankai (譚海), an essay collection by Souan Tsumura, includes a story about a binbōgami:

During a nap, a man dreams of a ragged old man entering the room. Thereafter, everything the man did went wrong. Four years later, in another dream, the old man appears again. The old man says that he will leave the house and tells the man how to send a binbōgami away: Make some baked rice and baked miso, and place them on an oshiki (wooden board, with four bent edges to serve as a tray), and take it through the back door and dump them into the river. The old man also reveals how to avoid binbōgami thereafter: Not to make any baked miso, which is preferred by binbōgami, and to never eat any raw miso, which makes poverty too severe to light a fire to bake miso. The man did as he was told, and he never again experienced poverty.

It is also said that hospitality of the inhabited people may turn binbōgami into fukunokami. Ihara Saikaku's Nippon Eidaigura (日本永代蔵) includes the story (Inoru shirushi no kami no oshiki 祈る印の神の折敷 lit. oshiki as a praying sign) which tells

About the man who deified a binbōgami. At the night of Jinjitsu (January 7 in the former Japanese calendar), a binbōgami appeared at the man's bedside and thanked him, "I had a prepared dinner on a tray for the first time," and made the man a millionaire in return. And it is also said that a poor hatamoto (middle-class bushi), who thought binbōgami had brought him security as well as poverty, put sake and rice out to pray to binbōgami for a little bit of luck. And then, he received a little bit of luck. This binbōgami is now enshrined beside Kitano Shrine, in Bunkyō ward, Tokyo. If you pray at the small shrine to welcome binbōgami temporarily, and send him away 21 days later, it is said, you can avoid binbōgami thereafter.

See also
Japanese mythology in popular culture
List of legendary creatures from Japan

References 

Abundance gods
Fortune gods
Japanese legendary creatures